Willows is a suburb of Bloemfontein.  It housed the first post office which was built in Bloemfontein. The post office was built in King Edward Drive, and most young people would know it as King Edward Cafe, however due to communication gaps, King Edward Cafe was demolished in 2006, to make space for residential flats.

References

Suburbs of Bloemfontein